Popovsky is a rural locality (a khutor) in Beryozovskoye Rural Settlement, Novoanninsky District, Volgograd Oblast, Russia. The population was 96 as of 2010. There are 3 streets.

Geography 
Popovsky is located on the Panika River, 35 km northwest of Novoanninsky (the district's administrative centre) by road. Bolshoy Dubovsky is the nearest rural locality.

References 

Rural localities in Novoanninsky District